Xilam is a French production company which specializes in making animated television series and feature films. Marc du Pontavice and his wife Alix founded it in 1999 as a replacement for the animation division of Gaumont Multimédia. Gaumont continued to have a deal with Xilam until 2003. Gaumont Multimédia was a video game publisher until closing in 2004.

In 2019, it was announced that Xilam would be acquiring 50.1% of French CG studio Cube Creative. The deal was finalized on January 20, 2020.

History 
Programs including Shuriken School, Space Goofs, and Oggy and the Cockroaches were internationally successful. In 2003, the company released its first animated feature film, the CGI-based Kaena: The Prophecy, and in 2005 announced an animated film based on The New Adventures of Lucky Luke. In 2012, they announced Oggy and the Cockroaches: The Movie would be made. In 2016 the studio opened a new office in Lyon, France.

In 2020, Xilam acquired the French animation production company Cube Creative.

Filmography

Animated series

In Collaboration With Disney Television Animation 

 Chip 'n' Dale: Park Life (2021)

In Collaboration With Warner Bros. Animation 
 Hurry, Hurry, Tom and Jerry (2023)

In Collaboration With DreamWorks Animation Television 
 Mr. Magoo (2019)

Purchased from Gaumont 

 Dragon Flyz (1996–97)
 Sky Dancers (1996)
 Space Goofs (1997–2006)
 The Magician (1997–98)
 Oggy and the Cockroaches (1998–2019)

Original 
 Cartouche: Prince of the Streets (2001)
 Shuriken School (2006–07)
 Rintindumb (2006)
 A Kind of Magic (2008–2018)
 Rahan (2007)
 Mr. Baby (2009–10)
 Zig & Sharko (2010–present)
 The Daltons (2010–2015) — animated television series, based on the Daltons from the Lucky Luke franchise
 FloopaLoo, Where Are You? (2011–2014)
 Hubert and Takako (2013—2015)
 What's the Big Idea? (2014) (fr)
 Rolling with the Ronks! (2016–2017)
 Paprika (2017–present)
 Coach Me If You Can (2019–present)
 Where's Chicky? (2019–present)
 Boon & Pimento (2020)
 Moka's Fabulous Adventures! (2020–present)
 The Adventures of Bernie (2021–present) 
 Oggy Oggy (2021)
 Lucy Lost (TBA)
 Lupin's Tales (2021)
 Athleticus (2021)
 Oggy and the Cockroaches: Next Generation (2022)
 Karate Sheep (2023)
 The Doomies (2024)
 Gemma and the Defenders (TBA)
 Phil & Sophia (TBA)

In Collaboration With Tooncan 
 The New Adventures of Lucky Luke (2001–03)
 Ratz (2003)
 Tupu (2004–05)

In Collaboration with CrossRiver Productions 
 Boon and Pimento (2020)

Film

Purchased from Gaumont 
 Dragon Flyz: The Legend Begins (1996; a compilation of the first three episodes of Dragon Flyz)

Original 
 Kaena: The Prophecy (2003)
 Shuriken School: The Ninja's Secret (2007)
 Go West! A Lucky Luke Adventure (2007)
 Oggy and the Cockroaches: The Movie (2013)
 I Lost My Body (2019; Xilam's first R-rated movie)
 The Migrant (2024)

Other productions

Purchased from Gaumont 
Monster Men (Single version of the opening song in the series Space Goofs; performed by Iggy Pop, distributed by Virgin Records)

Original 
Stupid Invaders (2000) (Video game adapted from the series Space Goofs)
Do not panic on board (Single version of the opening song in the series Ratz; distributed by Sony Music)

References

External links

 
2002 initial public offerings
Companies listed on Euronext Paris
French animation studios
French companies established in 1997
Mass media companies established in 1997
Television production companies of France
Companies based in Paris